Usb8x is a flash application for the TI-84 Plus and TI-84 Plus SE graphing calculators.  It is a driver that interfaces with the calculator's built in USB On-The-Go port, allowing developers to easily create their own USB device drivers for use on the calculators.  This allows the newfound use of USB peripherals such as a USB mouse, USB keyboard, or a USB flash drive. The programming is currently in alpha/beta testing for both TI-BASIC and flash application storage and management.

Compatibility

Supported by driver 
 HID Mouse
 HID Keyboard
 TI Silverlink

Compatible; lack driver support
 TI-84 Plus
 Vernier EasyTemp
 EMS HID PlayStation 2 Controller Adapter
 Lexar Jumpdrive ("secure edition" works too)
 Canon i850 Printer
 Logitech Precision Gamepad
 Motorola SURFboard cable modem
 Apacer Handy Steno HT202 USB Memory Stick 128MB
 Sony PSP system when enabled as a USB device
 Most other USB Mass storage devices which don't draw much power from the USB Port

Not compatible
 Ezonics Webcam
 SMC 802.11b Adapter
 Sandisk Cruzer Mini Flash Drive

External links
Usb8x Homepage
ticalc.org News Article

Graphics software